The Library of Congress National Digital Library Program (NDLP) is assembling a digital library of reproductions of primary source materials to support the study of the history and culture of the United States.  Begun in 1995 after a five-year pilot project, the program began digitizing selected collections of Library of Congress archival materials that chronicle the nation's rich cultural heritage.  In order to reproduce collections of books, pamphlets, motion pictures, manuscripts and sound recordings, the Library has created a wide array of digital entities: bitonal document images, grayscale and color pictorial images, digital video and audio, and searchable e-texts.  To provide access to the reproductions, the project developed a range of descriptive elements: bibliographic records, finding aids, and introductory texts and programs, as well as indexing the full texts for certain types of content.

The reproductions were produced with a variety of tools: image scanners, digital cameras, devices that digitize audio and video, and human labor for rekeying and encoding texts. American Memory employs national-standard and well established industry-standard formats for many digital reproductions, e.g., texts encoded with Standard Generalized Markup Language (SGML) and images stored in Tagged Image File Format (TIFF) files or compressed with the Joint Photographic Experts Group (JPEG) algorithm.  In other cases, the lack of well established standards has led to the use of emerging formats, e.g., RealAudio (for audio), QuickTime (for moving images), and MrSID (for maps).  Technical information by types of material and by individual collections is also available at this site.

Vision
The Library of Congress is trying to extend its brick and mortar library services to include services to the entire web.  While the original Library was focused on the needs of the US Congress, it now struggles with dealing with the whole world through the Internet. The collection includes an eclectic mix of documents, images, videos and sound recordings.  Images include maps, sheet music, handwritten documents, drawings and architectural diagrams.  The goal of a Library of Congress Internet Library should be to provide access to those materials unique to the Library of Congress as well as a clear guide to any internet materials related to the United States.

If you search "digital library project" + "library of congress" on the web, you will get a cluttered view of what the Library of Congress is providing.  The Library of Congress Global Gateway at site:international.loc.gov has about 200,000 documents currently.  The main page provides links but no context.  The American Memory at site:memory.loc.gov has about 350,000 documents.  The main page is similarly vague.

An Internet Library is more than a haphazard collection of materials on an internet server.  It serves an entire world, not just those who can afford subscription feeds, or who receive grants through US government agencies. Likewise it does not discriminate against very young users, or languages other than English.  Its purpose, scope, and contents are readily understood at any location within the site.  It is not needlessly repetitive.  It recognizes the value of the users' time, and makes every effort to constantly improve performance and the users' success.

Because materials are available to anyone – of any age or background, in any country – an Internet Library needs to be more open and inclusive.  LoC is just beginning to serve the needs of the world's internet users.

Topics Mentioned:
America – Industry, Technology, Cities, Towns, Culture, Literature, Performing Arts, Music, Folklife, Architecture, Landscape, Environment, Sports, Recreation,
America – Government, Military, Law, Religion, Advertising, Conservation,
America – Presidents, Women's History, African American History, Native American History, American Expansion, Immigration, War
Missing – Sciences, Universities, Occupations, American Resources other than LoC, Agriculture, Arts,
Missing – Wiki tools, User communities to improve the site, Internet Maps,

Content Mentioned: Bibliographic databases, Online Catalogs, current issues of favorite journals, new acquisitions, indexes to journal literature, references from scholarly publications, lists of readings, classroom presentations, lesson plans, "valuable materials", articles, textbooks

User Categories Mentioned: School teachers, scholars, students, internet users,

User Purposes Mentioned: Term papers, presentations, reports, online projects,

Digital library users
In 1989, to help launch the American Memory pilot project, a consultant surveyed 101 members of the Association of Research Libraries and the 51 state library agencies.  The survey disclosed a genuine appetite for on-line collections, especially in research libraries serving higher education.  The American Memory pilot (1990–1995) identified multiple audiences for digital collections in a special survey, an end-user evaluation and in thousands of conversations, letters and encounters with visitors.

The most thorough audience appraisal carried out by the Library of Congress consisted of an end-user evaluation conducted in 1992–1993.  Forty-four school, college and university, and state and public libraries were provided with a dozen American Memory collections on CD-ROMs and videodisks (these formats are no longer being supported). Participating library staff, teachers, students and the public were polled about which digitized materials they had used and how well the delivery systems worked.  The evaluation indicated continued interest by institutions of higher education as well as public libraries.  The surprising finding, however, was the strong showing of enthusiasm in schools, especially at the secondary level. Library Science students however should be more wary of such a development given the potential for unwarranted changes being made to the collection.

The evaluation team learned that recent reforms in education had created a need for primary-source historical materials such as those in the Library's incomparable collections.   Teachers welcomed digitized collections to aid in the development of critical thinking skills; school librarians used the electronic resource to inculcate research skills.  These findings have been validated in the educational outreach program initiated by the Library of Congress in 1995 and initially funded by the W. K. Kellogg Foundation.

Educational outreach
In 1995, in conjunction with the launch of the Library of Congress National Digital Library Program, the Library brought together leading history and social studies K-12 teachers and librarians to consider how archival on-line resources could best be used in the nation's schools.  The participants at this Educator's Forum validated earlier findings: that while the primary sources were in great demand, for teachers to be able to make effective use of them, they needed additional materials to frame the collections and the topics represented in the collections.  To this end in 1996, the Library of Congress developed The Learning Page—a gateway to the digital collections, which provides contextual material, search help and evaluate their materials under development.  The Library  continued the American Memory Fellows Program in the summer of 1998 with the goal of building champions for their collections in schools across the country.

See also
Data format management
Digital curation
Digital library
Digital preservation
Digital Preservation Coalition
Global legal information network
Inter-university Consortium for Political and Social Research
Internet Archive
List of digital library projects
Metadata Encoding and Transmission Standard (METS)
National Archives and Records Administration (NARA)
National Digital Information Infrastructure and Preservation Program (NDIIPP)
National Geospatial Digital Archive
National Science Foundation (NSF)
Open Archival Information System
Open Archives Initiative (OAI)
Protocol for Metadata Harvesting (PMH)
Pandora Archive

References

External links
Global Gateway
LC 21: A Digital Strategy for the Library of Congress
Library of Congress, American Memory
Library of Congress, Digital Preservation
Library of Congress, National Digital Library Program
The Library of Congress, Sustainability of Digital Formats
The Library of Congress, Web Capture

Ebook suppliers
American digital libraries
National Digital Library Program
Supercomputer sites
University of California, San Diego
Web archiving initiatives